Dramma per musica (Italian, literally: drama for music, plural: drammi per musica) is a libretto. The term was used by dramatists in Italy and elsewhere between the mid-17th and mid-19th centuries. In modern times the same meaning of drama for music was conveyed through the Italian Greek-rooted word melodramma (from μέλος = song or music + δρᾶμα = scenic action). Dramma per musica never meant "drama through music", let alone music drama.

A dramma per musica was thus originally (in Italy in the 17th century) a verse drama specifically written for the purpose of being set to music, in other words a libretto for an opera, usually a serious opera (a libretto meant for opera buffa, i.e. comic opera, would have been called a dramma giocoso).  By extension, the term came to be used also for the opera or operas which were composed to the libretto, and a variation, dramma in musica, which emphasised the musical element, was sometimes preferred by composers.

In the 18th century, these terms, along with dramma musicale, came to be the most commonly used descriptions for serious Italian operas.  Today, these are known as opera seria, a term that was little-used when they were created.

The terms continued to be used in the early 19th century after Gluck's reforms had effectively ended the dominance of opera seria:  for example, some of Rossini's later serious operas were designated "dramma in musica".

Examples of drammi per musica are Cavalli's Xerse (1654), Erismena (1655), Vivaldi's Tito Manlio (1719), Mysliveček's Il Bellerofonte (1767), Gluck's Paride ed Elena (1770), Salieri's Armida (1779), Mozart's Idomeneo (1781) and Rossini's Otello (1816), as well as numerous libretti written by Pietro Metastasio.

References

Opera genres
Italian opera terminology